The canton of Lure-1 is an administrative division of the Haute-Saône department, northeastern France. It was created at the French canton reorganisation which came into effect in March 2015. Its seat is in Lure.

It consists of the following communes:
 
Adelans-et-le-Val-de-Bithaine
Betoncourt-lès-Brotte
Bouhans-lès-Lure
Châteney
Châtenois
La Creuse
Creveney
Dambenoît-lès-Colombe
Franchevelle
Froideterre
Genevrey
Linexert
Lure (partly)
Malbouhans
La Neuvelle-lès-Lure
Quers
Ronchamp
Saint-Germain
Saulx
Servigney
Velleminfroy

References

Cantons of Haute-Saône